The 19425/19426 Mumbai Central - Nandurbar Express is an express train of the Indian Railways connecting  in Maharashtra and  of Maharashtra. It is currently being operated with 19425/19426 train numbers on a daily basis.

Service

The 19425/Mumbai Central - Nandurbar Express has average speed of 36 km/hr and covers 413 km in 11 hrs 20 mins.

The 19426/Nandurbar - Mumbai Central Express has average speed of 38 km/hr and covers 413 km in 10 hrs 50 mins.

Route 

Coach composite

The train consists of 15 coaches :

 5 Sleeper Class
 8 General Unreserved
 2 Seating cum Luggage Rake

Traction

Both trains are hauled by a Vadodara based WAP 7, WAP 5 or Valsad based WAG 5 P.

Rack Sharing 

The train shares its rake with 19417/19418 Mumbai Central–Ahmedabad Express.

External links 

 19425/Mumbai Central - Nandurbar Express
 19426/Nandurbar - Mumbai Central Express

References 

Express trains in India
Transport in Mumbai
Transport in Gujarat
Transport in Maharashtra